Cecil Frank Butcher (31 October 1872 – 22 March 1929) was an English cricketer.  Butcher was a right-handed batsman who bowled right-arm fast-medium.  He was born at Brighton, Sussex.

Butcher made his first-class debut for Sussex against Kent in 1894 County Championship at the County Ground, Hove.  He made five further first-class appearances for Sussex, the last of which came against Lancashire in 1896 County Championship.  Smith's role in a team was a bowler, in his six first-class matches for Sussex he took 9 wickets at an average of 39.44, with best figures of 3/107.  With the bat, he scored 36 runs at an average of 3.00, with a high score of 13.

He died at Portslade, Sussex, on 22 March 1929.

References

External links
Cecil Butcher at ESPNcricinfo
Cecil Butcher at CricketArchive

1872 births
1929 deaths
Sportspeople from Brighton
English cricketers
Sussex cricketers